Järvi is a Finnish and Estonian surname meaning "lake". Notable people with the surname include:

 Iiro Järvi (born 1965), Finnish ice hockey player
 Jyrki Järvi (born 1966), Finnish sailor, Olympic champion
 Kristjan Järvi (born 1972), Estonian-American conductor
 Neeme Järvi (born 1937), Estonian-born U.S. conductor
 Paavo Järvi (born 1962), Estonian-American conductor
 Raivo Järvi (1954-2012), aka Onu Raivo, Estonian artist, radio personality, politician
 Teet Järvi (born 1958),  Estonian cellist
 Sami Järvi (Sam Lake) (born 1970), a Finnish writer, Max Payne video game series
 Michael Jarvi, independent pro wrestler

Finnish-language surnames